Jeanne Stuart (13 August 1908 – 12 February 2003), born Ivy Sweet, was a British stage and film actress.

Using the stage name Jeanne Stuart, she performed on the London stage, on Broadway, and in motion pictures. She made her motion picture debut in 1931 and went on to perform and star in more than twenty films. Her West End stage appearances included Walter C. Hackett's Road House (1932), Afterwards (1933) and Espionage (1935). In 1945 she appeared in the hit musical Under the Counter alongside Cicely Courtneidge.

She was married in 1933 to businessman Bernard Docker but their union lasted only a few months. Docker's disapproving father had her followed by private detectives; on discovering her association with actor David Hutcheson, allegedly involving 'circumstances which left no doubt of their adultery', Docker divorced her.
 
After World War II, she moved to the United States, taking up residence on Long Island. She met Baron Eugène Daniel von Rothschild, a member of the Rothschild family and grandson of Salomon Mayer von Rothschild of the Rothschild banking family of Austria. They married in 1952, after which she gave up her acting career. For a time, she and her husband lived in New York City and Long Island but eventually made their permanent home in Monte Carlo, Monaco.

Baroness Jeanne de Rothschild died in Monte Carlo in 2003.

Filmography

References

External links

English film actresses
English stage actresses
Rothschild family
1908 births
2003 deaths